Daniel Jackson (born July 10, 1989) is an American professional soccer player who plays as a forward.

Career

College and amateur
Jackson played four years of college soccer, two years spent at Cumberland University before transferring to Coker College in 2012.

While at college, Jackson appeared for Premier Development League clubs Kalamazoo Outrage and FC JAX Destroyers, as well as NPSL club D.C. United U-23.

Professional
On January 21, 2014 Jackson was selected in the fourth round (70th overall) of the 2014 MLS SuperDraft by Real Salt Lake. However, he wasn't signed by the club.

Jackson signed with NASL club Carolina RailHawks on March 12, 2014.

After a season in the United Soccer League with Charlotte Independence in 2015, Jackson moved to fellow USL club Oklahoma City Energy on February 2, 2016.

On July 11, 2017, Jackson was transferred to Saint Louis FC from the Oklahoma City Energy on a permanent deal, while Saint Louis FC sent José Angulo to OKC in return.

In February 2018, Jackson joined National Premier Leagues Tasmania side Devonport City for a short spell ending in early June.

Jackson returned to the United States by signing with the Richmond Kickers on February 11, 2019.

In January 2020, Jackson signed with South Georgia Tormenta FC of USL League One.

In August 2021, Jackson joined National Independent Soccer Association side Chattanooga FC.

References

External links 
 

1989 births
Living people
People from Silver Spring, Maryland
Sportspeople from Montgomery County, Maryland
Soccer players from Maryland
American soccer players
Association football forwards
Cumberland Phoenix men's soccer players
Kalamazoo Outrage players
FC JAX Destroyers players
Coker University alumni
D.C. United U-23 players
Real Salt Lake draft picks
North Carolina FC players
Charlotte Independence players
OKC Energy FC players
Saint Louis FC players
Richmond Kickers players
Orlando SeaWolves players
Tormenta FC players
USL League Two players
National Professional Soccer League (1984–2001) players
North American Soccer League players
USL Championship players
National Premier Leagues players
Kakkonen players
USL League One players
Major Arena Soccer League players
American expatriate soccer players
American expatriate sportspeople in Australia
American expatriate sportspeople in Finland
Expatriate footballers in Finland
Expatriate soccer players in Australia
Bollklubben-46 players